The Coolpix S4 is a brand of digital camera produced by Nikon. Its image sensor is a CCD with 6.0 million pixels. It has a  thin-film transistor liquid crystal display device with 110,000 pixels. The S4 incorporates Nikon's popular swivel design which allows the addition of a powerful Nikkor 10X Optical zoom lens, yet retain a compact form.  Other features include D-Lighting and Face-priority AF.

Nikon later released the Nikon Coolpix S10 which has a similar 10x swivel lens design as the S4, but with more advanced features such as vibration reduction and a lithium ion battery.

See also 

 Nikon Coolpix S1
 Nikon Coolpix S3
 Nikon Coolpix S10
 Nikon Coolpix 950
 Nikon Coolpix 995
 Nikon Coolpix 4500

References 
 "Nikon Coolpix S4"

External links

 Nikon product archives: "Nikon Coolpix S4"

S0004